Christina Stephenson is an American attorney and politician from Oregon. She currently serves as the Oregon Commissioner of Labor. She previously ran as a Democrat for a seat in the Oregon House of Representatives.

Early life and career
Stephenson was born and raised in Washington County, Oregon. She graduated from Hillsboro High School. She earned a bachelor's degree from American University in international politics in 2005 and a Juris Doctor from the University of Oregon School of Law in 2009. She joined the Portland, Oregon, law firm Meyer Stephenson and became a partner.

Political career
In the 2020 elections, Stephenson ran for the open seat in the 33rd district of the Oregon House of Representatives. She lost in the Democratic Party primary election to Maxine Dexter.

With Val Hoyle not running for reelection, Stephenson ran for Oregon Labor Commissioner in the 2022 election. In the May nonpartisan blanket primary, she advanced to a runoff against Cheri Helt. She won in the November 8 general election.

Personal life
Stephenson's husband, Erik Wasik, is also an attorney. They have a son together.

References

21st-century American lawyers
21st-century American women lawyers
21st-century American women politicians
American University alumni
Living people
Oregon lawyers
Women in Oregon politics
University of Oregon School of Law alumni
Year of birth missing (living people)